Countersett is the largest of the three settlements in Raydale, around Semerwater in the Richmondshire district of North Yorkshire, England. It is in the Yorkshire Dales to the north of the lake. The Boar East and West were once one farm, and before that a pub called The Boar Inn. The date 1667 was above the door, along with a Latin inscription which translated as "Now mine, once thine, but whose afterwards I do not know" (ref. Wensleydale, by Ella Pontefract, Dent & Sons, 1936)

Countersett Hall was built in 1650 for Richard Robinson, the first Quaker in Wensleydale. It is a stone built Manor House with slate roofs. Illicit Quaker meetings were held in the Hall before the building of the nearby Meeting House. George Fox, a founder of the Society of Friends, stayed at Countersett Hall in 1652 and 1677.

Popular culture
Countersett was featured in the British television series All Creatures Great and Small, in the episode "Two of a Kind".

References

External links

 detailed map of Countersett showing the positions and names of all 12 buildings in the village and the roads to Stalling Busk, Marsett, Burtersett and Bainbridge

Villages in North Yorkshire
Wensleydale